The Amboina Serenaders were a successful and popular group that did well in the Netherlands in the 1950s. Its members included Ming Luhulima, Rudi Wairata and Joyce Aubrey, the ex-wife of George de Fretes. They had a top ten hit in the Netherlands with "Klappermelk Met Suiker".

History

The Amboina Serenaders evolved out of the  Mena Muria Minstrels, a group founded by Rudi Wairata in 1950.

Line ups
The line up included George de Fretes's ex-wife Joyce Aubrey. Another member of the group was Miing Luhulima.  In addition to Wairata, Luhulima and Aubrey, their 1953 line up also included Jack Salakory and Joop Sahanaya. In that year, there was a disagreement of sorts within the group which caused founder Wairata to leave. From then onwards, the group was led by Luhulima. In 1958, Aubrey left the band to join the Royal Hawaiian Minstrels which was a band led by her former husband George. The group broke up some time after that.

Recordings
In 1955, they did well with "Goro Goro Me’". The following year their single "Klappermelk Met Suiker" which was composed by Pierre Wijnnobel peaked at #9, spending 5 weeks in the charts. The title of the song translates as "I want coconut milk with sugar.

Later years
In 1981, founding member Rudi Wairata died.

Members
 Joyce Aubrey aka Joyce de Fretes - Vocals 
 Charlie Kuipers - Steel Guitar
 Ming Luhulima - Ukulele
 David Nanuru - Steel Guitar 
 Joop Sahanaya - Guitar
 Tjak Salakory - Bass 
 Rudi Wairata - Steel Guitar

Other members
 Pariury
 Patty

Discography

78 RPM Singles
 The Amboina Serenaders O.l.v.  Rudi Wairata  – "Ja Hoera" / "Hela Arombai" - RCA – 18154 
 Rudi Wairata En Zijn  Amboina Serenaders - "Nona Pédédé" / "Hoera Hoera Tjintjin" -  RCA 28105 - (1955) 
 Rudi Wairata En Zijn  Amboina Serenaders - "Ik wil klappermelk met suiker" / "Soerabaja" - RCA 28117 - (1956)
 Rudi Wairata And His  Amboina Serenaders  – "É-Tanasé" / "Waktoe-Potong-Padi" - RCA – 28119 
 Rudi Wairata And His  Amboina Serenaders – "Goodbye To You Nona Manis" / "Kota Ambon" - RCA – 28129 - (1956)

45 RPM singles
 The Amboina Serenaders - "Panggajo E Panggajo" / "Sarinandé" - RCA 48102 - (1955)
 The Amboina Serenaders - "Waktoe Potong Padi" / "E Tanase" - Omega 35.357 - (1962)
 The Amboina Serenaders - "Goodbye To You Nona Manis" / "Kota Ambon" - Omega 35.359 - (1962)

Extended play
 The Amboina Serenaders - "Ouw-Ulat Ee", "Pantai Waijamé" / "Ladju-Ladju", " Hoehaté" - CID 75.875 - (1957)

10" LP
 Rudi Wairata And His Amboina Serenaders – Amboina - RCA 130.153 L.P

12" LP
 Amboina Serenaders  – Goodbye To You, Nona Manis - Dureco 51.054 
 The Amboina Serenaders* o.l.v. Ming Luhulima -  The Amboina Serenaders - GIP – 2L 51.015/16 - (1967)
 Ming Luhulima And His  Amboina Serenaders - Ming Luhulima And His  Amboina Serenaders - Dureco 51.005

References

Dutch musical groups
Musical groups established in 1953
Dureco artists